John A. Porter may refer to:
 John Addison Porter (1822–1866), American professor of chemistry
 John Addison Porter (Secretary to the President) (1856–1900), first Secretary to the President of the United States
 John Porter (sociologist) (1921–1979), Canadian sociologist